Events from the year 1718 in art.

Events
 Arnold Houbraken publishes his biographical work De groote schouburgh der Nederlantsche konstschilders en schilderessen ("The Great Theatre of Dutch Painters and Woman Artists").

Paintings
 Jonathan Richardson – Alexander Pope and his dog, Bounce
 Jacob van Schuppen – Prince Eugene of Savoy
 Antoine Watteau – La Surprise

Births
 January – Johann Melchior Kambly, Swiss sculptor who took part in the development of the architectural style of Frederician Rococo (died 1783)
 April 24 – Nathaniel Hone, Irish-born painter (died 1784)
 June 5 – Thomas Chippendale, English furniture maker (died 1779)
 July 4 – Giambettino Cignaroli, Italian painter of the Rococo and early Neoclassic period (d. 1770)
 July 15 – Alexander Roslin, Swedish portrait painter (died 1793)
 August 16 – Jakob Emanuel Handmann, Swiss painter (died 1781)
 August 28 – Claude-Henri Watelet, French fermier-général, amateur painter and writer on the arts (died 1786)
 September 25 – Martin Johann Schmidt, Austrian painter (died 1801)
 October 17 – Christoffer Foltmar, Danish painter of miniatures and organist (died 1759)
 date unknown
 Joseph Bergler the Elder, Austrian sculptor (died 1788)
 Giuseppe Camerata, Italian miniature painter and engraver (died 1803)
 Nicolas Desportes, French painter of hunting scenes (died 1787)
 James Giles, English artist in Worcester, Derby, Bow and Chelsea porcelain and also glass (died 1780)
 Maria Maddalena Baldacci, Italian painter born in Florence (died 1782)
 probable – Agostino Carlini, Italian sculptor and painter (died 1790)

Deaths
 May 24 – Jeremiah Dummer, American silversmith and portrait painter (born 1645)
 May 29 – Giuseppe Avanzi, Italian painter (born 1645)
 December 25 – Franz Joseph Feuchtmayer, German sculptor and stuccoist (born 1660)
 December 28 – Jan Brokoff, German sculptor (born 1652)
 date unknown
 Jan Griffier, Dutch painter (born c. 1645–1652)
 Juan Simón Gutiérrez, Spanish Baroque painter (born 1634)
 Kanō Tanshin, Japanese painter (born 1653)
 Wu Li, Chinese landscape painter and poet during the Qing Dynasty (born 1632)
 probable
 Josias English, English etcher (born unknown)
 Giuseppe Laudati, Italian painter of the Baroque period (born 1672)
 Girolamo Odam, Italian painter, pastel portraitist and landscape artist, as well as wood engraver (born 1681)
 Pasquale Rossi, Italian painter of the Baroque period (born 1641)

 
Years of the 18th century in art
1710s in art